Les Dames à la licorne ("the ladies with the unicorn") is a 1974 novel by the French writer René Barjavel and Irish astrologer Olenka de Veer. It is set in Ireland in the late 19th century and tells the story of five sisters who are connected to a medieval legend.

It was the basis for a 1982 television film with the same title, directed by Lazare Iglesis for TF1.

See also
 The Lady and the Unicorn
 Young Woman with Unicorn

References

1974 French novels
1974 science fiction novels
French novels adapted into films
Novels by René Barjavel
Novels set in Ireland
Novels set in the 19th century
Presses de la Cité books